Péninsule Jeanne d'Arc, also known as Presqu'île Jeanne d'Arc, (Joan of Arc Peninsula in English) is a peninsula of Grande Terre, the main island of the subantarctic Kerguelen archipelago in the southern Indian Ocean.

Description
Port Jeanne d'Arc is the site of an abandoned Norwegian whaling station at the western end of the peninsula's north coast that is subject to a cultural heritage conservation program.

Important Bird Area
The southern coast of the peninsula has been identified as a  Important Bird Area (IBA) by BirdLife International because of its breeding seabirds. To the east, a large glacial valley opens into the Baie de l’Antarctique. With the exception of the Canyon des Sourcils Noirs, at the eastern end of the site, which is regularly visited by scientists monitoring a study population of black-browed albatrosses, human presence is rare.

At least 21 species breed in the IBA.  Some 3,000 pairs of southern rockhopper penguins nest along the base of the cliffs, with about 2,500 pairs of gentoos and 130,000 pairs of macaronis.  Kerguelen's only population of sooty albatrosses is found at the Canyon des Sourcils Noirs, together with the 1,300 pairs of black-brows.  Other birds breeding in the site include northern giant petrels, Kerguelen terns light-mantled albatrosses, white-chinned petrels and Kerguelen shags.

References

Landforms of the Kerguelen Islands
Important Bird Areas of Kerguelen
Jeanne d'Arc
Peninsulas of France